Román Rubilio Castillo Álvarez (born 26 November 1991) is a Honduran professional footballer who plays as a striker for Chinese Super League club Nantong Zhiyun and the Honduras national team.

Club career
His debut in top flight football league was for C.D.S. Vida on 27 September 2008 against Hispano F.C. and he scored the only goal from his side. He used to play in an amateur championship with his team El Sauce where he won top goalscorer.

On 9 November 2008, Diario Deportivo Diez confirmed that he would go on trial with River Plate in November.

On 12 August 2018, Castillo scored the winning goal in the F.C. Motagua's 1–0 victory over Real C.D. España. With this goal, he became the club's all-time scorer with 77 goals. This also represented his 100th goal in Liga Nacional.  After his performance at the 2018 CONCACAF League, he was nominated for Player of the Year and was also included in the Best XI at the 2018 CONCACAF Awards.

In February 2023, Castillo joined Chinese Super League club Nantong Zhiyun.

International career

International goals
Scores and results list Honduras' goal tally first.

Honours
Individual
 CONCACAF League Golden Boot (Shared): 2018

References 

 

1991 births
Living people
People from La Ceiba
Association football forwards
Honduran footballers
Honduran expatriate footballers
Expatriate footballers in Mexico
Expatriate footballers in Costa Rica
Expatriate footballers in Portugal
Expatriate footballers in Bolivia
Expatriate footballers in Guatemala
Expatriate footballers in Colombia
Expatriate footballers in China
Honduran expatriate sportspeople in Mexico
Honduran expatriate sportspeople in Costa Rica
Honduran expatriate sportspeople in Portugal
Honduran expatriate sportspeople in Bolivia
Honduran expatriate sportspeople in Guatemala
Honduran expatriate sportspeople in Colombia
Honduran expatriate sportspeople in China
C.D.S. Vida players
Deportes Savio players
F.C. Motagua players
Correcaminos UAT footballers
Deportivo Saprissa players
C.D. Tondela players
Nantong Zhiyun F.C. players
Liga Nacional de Fútbol Profesional de Honduras players
Ascenso MX players
Liga FPD players
Primeira Liga players
Bolivian Primera División players
Liga Nacional de Fútbol de Guatemala players
Categoría Primera A players
Chinese Super League players
Honduras international footballers
2015 CONCACAF Gold Cup players
2017 Copa Centroamericana players
Copa Centroamericana-winning players
2019 CONCACAF Gold Cup players